The 1910–11 season was Manchester United's 19th season in the Football League and fourth in the First Division.

First Division

FA Cup

References

Manchester United F.C. seasons
Manchester United
1911